Rajiv Shekhar (born 1960) is a professor and director at IIT(ISM) Dhanbad. Prior to joining IIT(ISM) Dhanbad, he was working as a professor at the Department of Materials Science and Engineering, IIT Kanpur. In recent times, he has been actively working towards research related to Solar thermal energy and applications.

Controversies
In 2018, Rajiv Shekhar along with 3 other professors from IIT Kanpur were alleged of making caste related remarks upon a newly appointed assistant professor at department of Aerospace engineering. As a consequence, a FIR was logged by the assistant professor against them of charges of harassment, mental torture and making caste remarks at local police.

The students and senior faculty members of the institute protested in front of IIT Kanpur director's residence for nearly two hours. The teachers threatened to boycott exams and tender collective resignation, while the students informed the authorities that they would start an agitation if the FIR was not expunged.

A high court judge found the four teachers guilty of flouting IIT Kanpur's conduct code and the SC/ST Preventions Atrocities Act and as a result the complaint was taken to the National Commission for Scheduled Castes (NCSC).

The IIT Kanpur Board of Governors (BOG) last year found all the four teachers guilty of caste-based discrimination and has taken steps against the other three. But it has not acted against Prof. Shekhar as he had already been appointed director of IIT Dhanbad with the approval of the Visitor, the President of India.

Selected bibliography

Selected articles

References

Living people
1960 births
IIT Kanpur alumni
Academic staff of IIT Kanpur
Indian Institute of Technology directors
University of California, Berkeley alumni